Young Actors Theatre Islington (YATI) is an independent and co-educational performing arts school based in the Islington district of London, England. The organisation also functions as a charity agency for children and young adults who wish to pursue a career in acting.

History 
The theatre is housed inside a converted Edwardian chapel on Barnsbury Road, and has been a home for the dramatic arts since 1972.

Formerly the site of the Anna Scher Theatre, the building was reorganised and rechristened the "Young Actors Theatre" in 2005 in order to better accommodate the goals of the charity.

In 2014, actor Andy Serkis became the president for the organisation, serving in the capacities of both sponsor and ambassador on behalf of the charity.

Notable alumni
 Asa Butterfield - (Hugo, Ender's Game)
 Franz Drameh - (Legends of Tomorrow, Edge of Tomorrow)
 Fady Elsayed - (Class, My Brother the Devil)
 Ella Purnell - (Never Let Me Go, Miss Peregrine's Home for Peculiar Children)

References

External links 
 Official website

Schools of the performing arts in the United Kingdom
Dance schools in the United Kingdom
Drama schools in London
Performing arts education in the United Kingdom
Performing arts education in London
Educational charities based in the United Kingdom